Daniel or Danny Greene may refer to:
 Daniel Greene (actor), U.S. actor in Falcon Crest
 Daniel Greene (artist) (1934–2020), American fine artist
 Daniel Crosby Greene (1843–1913), American missionary in Japan
 Daniel Joseph Greene (1850–1911), Canadian politician, premier of Newfoundland
 Danny Greene (1933–1977), Irish-American mobster
 Danny Greene (American football) (born 1961), NFL wide receiver

See also
 Daniel Green (disambiguation)